The 2020–21 Northern Kentucky Norse men's basketball team represented Northern Kentucky University in the 2020–21 NCAA Division I men's basketball season. The Norse, led by second-year head coach Darrin Horn, played their home games at BB&T Arena in Highland Heights, Kentucky as members of the Horizon League.

Previous season
The Norse finished the 2019–20 season 23–9, 13–5 in Horizon League play to finish in second place. They defeated Green Bay and UIC to become champions of the Horizon League tournament. They received the Horizon League's automatic bid to the NCAA tournament. However, the NCAA Tournament was cancelled amid the COVID-19 pandemic.

Roster

Schedule and results

|-
!colspan=12 style=| Non-conference regular season

|-
!colspan=9 style=| Horizon League regular season

|-
!colspan=12 style=| Horizon League tournament
|-

|-

Source

References

Northern Kentucky Norse men's basketball seasons
Northern Kentucky
Northern Kentucky Norse men's basketball
Northern Kentucky Norse men's basketball